Professor Layton and the Azran Legacy is a puzzle game developed by Level-5 for the Nintendo 3DS. It is the sixth entry in the Professor Layton series, making up the third and final part of the prequel trilogy of games and according to Level 5 CEO Akihiro Hino, it was intended to be the last Layton title to star Professor Layton himself as the protagonist. However, with the announcement of Professor Layton and The New World of Steam in 2023, this is no longer the case. The game saw a release in early to late 2013 in all territories except North America, where it was released on February 28 of the following year.

In a departure from the previous entries, Azran Legacy is an around the world adventure that sees Professor Layton and company journey to multiple locations both in and outside of England, in an attempt to uncover the truth behind the ancient elder race civilization, the Azran.

Story

Following the conclusion of Professor Layton and the Miracle Mask, Layton, Luke, and Emmy are invited by Professor Desmond Sycamore, an eminent archaeologist who affirms that he discovered a so-called living "mummy". Boarding the airship Bostonius, piloted by Raymond, Sycamore's butler, the trio rendezvous with Sycamore in the city of Froenborg where they help him free Aurora, a girl trapped in ice since ancient times with no memory of her past, when she is kidnapped by Targent's leader Leon Bronev. With help from Sycamore, Layton and Luke rescue Aurora from Targent's airship and the group escort her to some Azran ruins where she reveals the location of five Azran eggs, scattered around the world which are necessary to unlock the Azran Legacy.

Layton and the others return to London to prepare for their journey in search for the eggs. In the occasion, they help the Scotland Yard solve the mystery of several archaeological artifacts stolen from a local museum and expose Detective Inspector Leonard Bloom as a mole from Targent. Once their preparations are over, the group travel around the globe and retrieve the eggs, with Aurora recovering part of her memories with each artifact secured. During their travels, the group helps a jungle chief regain his sense of humor, learn of a popular island tradition that one egg inspired, clear up a misunderstanding about a wolf attacking a desert, stop a hillside from "sacrificing" women to prevent whirlwinds, and cure people in a walled city of a sleeping illness. Just after the last of the eggs is collected, Aurora discovers that one of them was previously stolen by Targent and replaced with a fake. Layton's team then infiltrates Targent's headquarters where they confront Bronev and retrieve the last egg, using it in conjunction with the others to create a master key that can unlock the Azran Legacy. Aurora recovers her memories and tries to warn the others that the Azran Legacy is dangerous, but Sycamore reveals himself as Jean Descole in disguise and steals the key.

The group chases Descole to the cave where they first met Aurora, where Layton and Descole are ambushed by Bronev. Emmy reveals herself as spy working for Bronev and betrays Layton, with Bronev heading inside the ruins, taking Aurora and the key with him. Layton and Descole chase after Bronev and in the occasion, Descole reveals himself as Layton's older brother, whose original name was Hershel, but passed on to his brother to help with his adoption into the Layton family, and that Bronev is their father, an archaeologist who was coerced to work for Targent at first, but later assumed control of the organization and is currently obsessed with nothing but to unlock the Azran secrets after his wife's death. Descole also reveals that all of his actions were part of his plan to enact revenge on Targent for destroying their family.

At the heart of the ruins, Layton catches up with Bronev, who apparently sacrifices Aurora to unlock the Azran Legacy, releasing thousands of golems that start destroying everything around them. Aurora reveals that the golems were created by the Azrans to serve them, but once they developed conscience, they rebelled against their masters, destroying the Azran civilization. In a final effort, the Azrans sealed the golems inside the ruins, leaving Aurora, who is the last of the golems, as an emissary to test mankind's worth, and due to Bronev's actions, the Azran ruins decided that mankind must be destroyed. Layton, Luke, Emmy, Descole and Bronev sacrifice themselves to stop the device that powers up the golems and moved by their gesture, Aurora pleas for their recovery to the Azran ruins, which they attend, but causing the ruins to self-destruct. With her mission fulfilled, Aurora bids farewell to Layton and co. who escape the ruins while she perishes inside them, while Descole takes the opportunity to flee.

Once in safety, Bronev is arrested by Inspector Grosky for his crimes. Before being taken into custody, Bronev reveals that Layton's true name is Theodore Bronev. Layton denies this and wishes to keep his adoptive name, refusing to recognize Bronev as his father, but he hopes that they can meet again as friends and fellow archaeologists one day. Back in London, Emmy renounces her position as Layton's assistant, but promises to return when she proves herself worthy of it. Descole is last seen flying away with Raymond on a restored Bostonius, searching for a new purpose in life. The game ends with Luke and Layton driving in the countryside as they plan to solve an inheritance dispute at village of St. Mystere, setting up the plot for Professor Layton and the Curious Village.

Gameplay

Similar to previous games, Professor Layton and the Azran Legacy is a puzzle game split into various chapters. The game follows Professor Layton and his friends as they explore various environments and solve many puzzles. Gameplay is similar to that of Professor Layton and the Miracle Mask, in which players utilise the stylus on the touchscreen to search environments for clues and solve the various puzzles the game has to offer. In certain areas, it is possible to zoom into areas with the magnifying glass, to get a closer look at things. The game features over 500 new puzzles, more than its predecessor, in which there were 515. Hint coins can also be found and used to help the player solve a puzzle if they are stuck. Throughout the game, you can also unlock minigames which appear in the trunk including Nutty Roller, Dress Up and Bloom Burst. Gameplay involves travel to different parts of the world, such as the United States of America, South Africa, and Russia.

Music
The soundtrack was composed by Tomohito Nishiura. The ending theme, entitled "Surely Someday", was performed by Miho Fukuhara.

Reception

Professor Layton and the Azran Legacy received "generally favorable" reception, according to review aggregator Metacritic.

Notes

References

External links

2013 video games
Adventure games
Level-5 (company) games
Nintendo 3DS games
Nintendo 3DS eShop games
Nintendo 3DS-only games
Nintendo games
Nintendo Network games
Fiction about resurrection
Video game prequels
Detective video games
Professor Layton
Video games developed in Japan
Video games scored by Tomohito Nishiura
Single-player video games